The year 1526 in science and technology included many events, some of which are listed here.

Events
 Publication of Peter Treveris's The Grete Herball (a translation of Le Grant Herbier) in England.
 May 23 – Transit of Venus occurs
 December 5 - Paracelsus joins the Zur Lutzerne guild of Strasbourg.

Births
 February 19 – Carolus Clusius, Flemish botanist (died 1609)
 Taqi al-Din Muhammad ibn Ma'ruf, Arab astronomer and inventor (died c.  1585)

Deaths
 Eucharius Rösslin, German obstetrician (born c. 1470)

References

 
16th century in science
1520s in science